Crystal Kay is an album by Japanese R&B singer Crystal Kay. It compiles Crystal Kay's English language songs, and was released across Asia in November 2003. It was re-released in Japan on December 17, 2003, under the name Natural: World Premiere Album.

Contents 

The album features six cover songs and six original compositions of Crystal Kay's. All of the songs on the album had been previously released, except for three: "Can't Be Stopped ('Til the Sun Comes Up)", "I'm Not Alone" and the English version of "Boyfriend (Part II)", "Boyfriend (What Makes Me Fall in Love)". The already released songs are mostly composed of B-sides from Crystal Kay's singles between 1999 and 2003, including "Fly Away" from her debut single, "Eternal Memories". The song "Couldn't Care Less" was originally from 637: Always and Forever (2001), and "Love of a Lifetime" originated on Almost Seventeen (2003).

Two songs are exclusive to the Japanese edition of the album, "Liberty", a Masayuki Suzuki cover, and "No More Blue Christmas'", a Natalie Cole cover. "Liberty" was later compiled on Suzuki Mania: Suzuki Masayuki Tribute Album released in February 2004, and "No More Blue Christmas'" on Crystal Kay's 2007 extended play Shining and her 2011 compilation album Love Song Best.

Release and promotion 

In November 2003, the album was released in Asian territories including South Korea, Taiwan, Hong Kong and Thailand. After Crystal Kay's fourth Japanese studio album, 4 Real, was released on November 27, 2003, a Japanese edition of Crystal Kay entitled Natural was released in Japan on December 17, 2003, featuring two bonus tracks. To promote the release, Crystal Kay appeared at the 2003 Mnet Asian Music Awards in Seoul, South Korea on November 27, 2003, performing the English version of "Can't Be Stopped ('Til the Sun Comes Up)". This was her first live performance outside Japan.

Critical reception 

Miwako Koyama of Shinko Music felt that the experience of listening to this album was different to listening to a regular Western release, despite all of the songs being sung in English. Because of how many songs were covers of songs from the 1980s, she felt as if she was being "immersed in the feeling of happiness" of a person playing their favorite songs for someone else. Tomoe Sato writing for Tower Records' in-store magazine Bounce praised the English language versions of "Can't Be Stopped" and "Boyfriend (Part II)", feeling that the English language version emphasized the songs' quality and Crystal Kay's singing voice. She felt that all of the album's cover songs had "refreshing" and "lovely" arrangements, and that the album should be listened together with her studio album 4 Real as a set.

Track listing

Chart rankings

Sales

Release history

References

External links
 Crystal Kay — official website

2003 compilation albums
Crystal Kay albums
Epic Records compilation albums